Acentropelma is a genus of spiders in the family Theraphosidae. It was first described in 1901 by Pocock. , it contains 2 species.

Description  
Genus Acentropelma resembles genus Metriopelma, with the distinction of Scopula on the first leg and palp.

List of Species  
The following is a list of known species within the genus Acentropelma:
 Acentropelma gutzkei (Reichling, 1997) - Belize
 Acentropelma spinulosum (F. O. Pickard-Cambridge, 1897) (type) - Guatemala

Etymology
The term Acentropelma comes from the Greek combining form "a-" meaning "not, without, or opposite to", the Latin, "Centro-", meaning "Center"., and the Greek  "-Pelma" meaning "the underside or sole of the foot".

References

Theraphosidae
Theraphosidae genera
Spiders of Mexico
Spiders of Central America